Bánh bía, sometimes spelled bánh pía, is a type of Vietnamese cuisine bánh (translates loosely as "cake" or "bread"). A Suzhou style mooncake adapted from Teochew cuisine. The Vietnamese name comes from the Teochew word for pastry, "pia". In Saigon, the pastry is called “bánh bía” while in Sóc Trăng and Vũng Thơm it is known by "bánh Pía". Some Vietnamese call it bánh lột da, which translates to "peeling flakes pastry", and those from the Bến Tre region call it bánh bao chi, which is the name for Mochi elsewhere in Vietnam. Popular fillings include durian, shredded pork fat, salted egg yolk, mung bean paste, taro and coconut.

References

Teochew cuisine
Vietnamese pastries
Bánh
Stuffed desserts